Alocasia is a genus of rhizomatous or tuberous, broad-leaved, perennial, flowering plants from the family Araceae. There are about 90 accepted species native to tropical and subtropical Asia and eastern Australia. Around the world, many growers widely cultivate a range of hybrids and cultivars as ornamentals.

Description 
Their araceous flowers grow at the end of a short stalk, but are not conspicuous; often hidden behind the leaf petioles.

The corms of some species can be processed to make them edible, however, the raw plants contain raphid or raphide crystals of calcium oxalate along with other irritants (possibly including proteases) that can numb and swell the tongue and pharynx. This can cause difficulty breathing and sharp pain in the throat. Lower parts of the plant contain the highest concentrations of the poison.

Prolonged boiling before serving or processing may reduce risk of adverse reactions. Additionally, acidic fruit such as tamarind may dissolve the raphides altogether. It's important to note, however, that this genus varies in toxicity, and can still be dangerous to ingest, even after taking precautions.

Species
The following are the accepted species of Alocasia along with their common names (where available) and distribution ranges:

Nothospecies 
 The following list is incomplete.
The following are hybrid species in the genus Alocasia:
 A. × mortfontanensis André = A. longiloba × A. sanderiana (syn. A. × amazonica)

Cultivation

Alocasia are tropical plants that are increasingly becoming popular as houseplants. The hybrid A. × amazonica has gained the Royal Horticultural Society's Award of Garden Merit. They are typically grown as pot plants, but a better way is to grow the plants permanently in the controlled conditions of a greenhouse. They can tolerate dim light and cannot withstand direct sunlight. They should be cared for as any other tropical plant with weekly cleaning of the leaves, frequent fertilization and medium to high humidity.

They rarely survive cold winters or the dryness of artificial heating, but an attempt to slowly acclimatize plants from the summer garden to the house can help. Once inside, the watering period must be reduced and the plants should be protected from spider mites or red spider attack.

See also
Colocasia
Philodendron

References

External links 

Tips For Growing Elephant Ear Plants
How to Care for Indoor Elephant Ear Plants
Propagating Alocasia or elephants ear

 
Araceae genera